Gideon Charles Ray (born May 27, 1973) is a former American professional mixed martial artist. A professional from 2000 until 2012, Ray competed for the UFC, King of the Cage, the Toronto Dragons of the IFL, and was featured on The Ultimate Fighter 4.

Background
Born and raised in Chicago, Ray began training in martial arts from a young age.

Mixed martial arts

Early career
Ray made his professional debut in 2000, competing primarily at Welterweight, he amassed a record of 8–1–1 before appearing for the UFC.

Ultimate Fighting Championship
Ray made his UFC debut at UFC 51 on February 5, 2005 against Canadian David Loiseau. He was defeated via TKO due to a doctor stoppage in the first round.

After picking up a win in the regional circuit, Ray returned to the promotion at UFC Ultimate Fight Night, facing Mike Swick. He was defeated via TKO from a combination of punches just 22 seconds into the fight.

After going 4–1 in the regional circuit, Ray tried out for The Ultimate Fighter 4 and made it through to the final cast.

The Ultimate Fighter
In his quarterfinal matchup against Edwin Dewees, the two fought to a draw after two rounds, which called for a third round. As a cut had opened on Dewees face during the second round and the doctors let the fight continue. Ray lost the third round to a 10-9 decision by the judges. The bout was later called perhaps the bloodiest in Ultimate Fighter history.

At The Ultimate Fighter: The Comeback Finale, Ray faced Charles McCarthy. Ray was defeated near the end of the first round with an armbar submission.

International Fight League
After being released from the UFC, Ray signed with the IFL, competing for the Toronto Dragons. Ray made his promotional debut at IFL: Connecticut on April 13, 2007. He won via first-round TKO.

Ray next faced Brazilian Delson Heleno at IFL: Las Vegas on June 16, 2007. He was defeated via keylock submission in the second round.

The two later fought again in a rematch at the World Grand Prix Semifinals later in November of that year, with Heleno winning, this time via first-round armbar.

Independent promotions
After leaving the IFL, Ray went 3–7 in his final 10 fights, retiring in 2012.

Mixed martial arts record

|-
| Loss
| align=center| 17–15–1
| Shamar Bailey
| Decision (unanimous)
| Flawless FC 2
| 
| align=center| 3
| align=center| 5:00
| Chicago, Illinois, United States
| 
|-
| Loss
| align=center| 17–14–1
| Dwayne Hinds
| Decision (split)
| CUFF 4: The Shot
| 
| align=center| 3
| align=center| 5:00
| Spain
| 
|-
| Loss
| align=center| 17–13–1
| Sergej Juskevic
| Submission (heel hook)
| Wreck MMA: Unstoppable
| 
| align=center| 1
| align=center| 1:30
| Gatineau, Quebec, Canada
|Return to Welterweight.
|-
| Loss
| align=center| 17–12–1
| Daniel Mason-Straus
| Decision (unanimous)
| XFO 33
| 
| align=center| 3
| align=center| 5:00
| Chicago, Illinois, United States
| 
|-
| Win
| align=center| 17–11–1
| Luke Caudillo
| Decision (unanimous)
| Raw Power: MMA
| 
| align=center| 3
| align=center| 5:00
| Sanabis, Bahrain
| 
|-
| Loss
| align=center| 16–11–1
| Darren Elkins
| Decision (unanimous)
| Hoosier Fight Club 1: Raise Up
| 
| align=center| 3
| align=center| 5:00
| Valparaiso, Indiana, United States
|Lightweight debut.
|-
| Win
| align=center| 16–10–1
| Brandon Small
| Submission (rear-naked choke)
| TFC 17: Total Fight Challenge 17
| 
| align=center| 1
| align=center| 0:46
| Hammond, Indiana, United States
| 
|-
| Loss
| align=center| 15–10–1
| John Alessio
| TKO (punches)
| SuperFights MMA: Night of Combat 2
| 
| align=center| 1
| align=center| 0:45
| Las Vegas, Nevada, United States
| 
|-
| Loss
| align=center| 15–9–1
| Brandon Melendez
| Submission (rear-naked choke)
| WC 4: Warriors Collide 4
| 
| align=center| 1
| align=center| 3:23
| Colorado, United States
| 
|-
| Win
| align=center| 15–8–1
| Bryan Craven
| TKO (cut)
| WC 3: Warriors Collide 3
| 
| align=center| 1
| align=center| 2:48
| Pueblo, Colorado, United States
| 
|-
| Loss
| align=center| 14–8–1
| Nabil Khatib
| Decision (unanimous)
| HCF: Crow's Nest
| 
| align=center| 3
| align=center| 5:00
| Gatineau, Quebec, Canada
| 
|-
| Loss
| align=center| 14–7–1
| Delson Heleno
| Submission (armbar)
| IFL: World Grand Prix Semifinals
| 
| align=center| 1
| align=center| 1:57
| Hoffman Estates, Illinois, United States
|Catchweight (175 lbs) bout.
|-
| Loss
| align=center| 14–6–1
| Delson Heleno
| Submission (keylock)
| IFL: Las Vegas
| 
| align=center| 2
| align=center| 1:29
| Las Vegas, Nevada, United States
| 
|-
| Win
| align=center| 14–5–1
| Gabe Casillas
| TKO (strikes)
| International Fight League
| 
| align=center| 1
| align=center| 2:39
| Uncasville, Connecticut, United States
| 
|-
| Loss
| align=center| 13–5–1
| Charles McCarthy
| Submission (armbar)
| The Ultimate Fighter: The Comeback Finale
| 
| align=center| 1
| align=center| 4:43
| Las Vegas, Nevada, United States
|Middleweight bout.
|-
| Loss
| align=center| 13–4–1
| Jason MacDonald
| Decision (unanimous)
| ECC 1: Extreme Cage Combat 1
| 
| align=center| 3
| align=center| 5:00
| Halifax, Nova Scotia, Canada
| 
|-
| Win
| align=center| 13–3–1
| Jerry Spiegel
| TKO
| XFO 10: Explosion
| 
| align=center| 1
| align=center| 1:55
| Lakemoor, Illinois, United States
| 
|-
| Win
| align=center| 12–3–1
| Brendan Seguin
| Submission (heel hook)
| KOTC: Redemption on the River
| 
| align=center| 1
| align=center| 2:52
| Moline, Illinois, United States
|Middleweight bout.
|-
| Win
| align=center| 11–3–1
| Chris Fontaine
| TKO
| EFC 4: Extreme Fighting Challenge 4
| 
| align=center| 2
| align=center| N/A
| Prince George, British Columbia, Canada
| 
|-
| Win
| align=center| 10–3–1
| Trevor Garrett
| Submission (rear naked choke)
| KOTC: Xtreme Edge
| 
| align=center| 1
| align=center| 2:17
| Indianapolis, Indiana, United States
|
|-
| Loss
| align=center| 9–3–1
| Mike Swick
| TKO (punches)
| UFC Ultimate Fight Night
| 
| align=center| 1
| align=center| 0:22
| Las Vegas, Nevada, United States
| 
|-
| Win
| align=center| 9–2–1
| Dennis Reed
| TKO
| XFO 6: Judgment Day
| 
| align=center| 1
| align=center| 3:11
| Lakemoor, Illinois, United States
| 
|-
| Loss
| align=center| 8–2–1
| David Loiseau
| TKO (doctor stoppage)
| UFC 51: Super Saturday
| 
| align=center| 1
| align=center| 5:00
| Las Vegas, Nevada, United States
|Middleweight bout.
|-
| Win
| align=center| 8–1–1
| Shawn McCully
| TKO (submission to strikes)
| SMA: Shootfighting Martial Arts
| 
| align=center| N/A
| align=center| N/A
| Springfield, Illinois, United States
| 
|-
| Win
| align=center| 7–1–1
| Rhomez Brower
| TKO
| Combat: Do Fighting Challenge 1
| 
| align=center| 2
| align=center| N/A
| Cicero, Illinois, United States
| 
|-
| Loss
| align=center| 6–1–1
| Jason Black
| Decision (unanimous)
| IHC 7: Crucible
| 
| align=center| 3
| align=center| 5:00
| Hammond, Indiana, United States
| 
|-
| Win
| align=center| 6–0–1
| Jason Medina
| KO
| EC 51: Extreme Challenge 51
| 
| align=center| 2
| align=center| 1:41
| St. Charles, Illinois, United States
|Return to Welterweight.
|-
| Draw
| align=center| 5–0–1
| Brian Gassaway
| Draw
| Shooto: Midwest Fighting
| 
| align=center| 3
| align=center| 5:00
| Hammond, Indiana, United States
|Middleweight debut.
|-
| Win
| align=center| 5–0
| Matt Shaw
| TKO (submission to strikes)
| FCC 9: Freestyle Combat Challenge 9
| 
| align=center| N/A
| align=center| N/A
| Racine, Wisconsin, United States
| 
|-
| Win
| align=center| 4–0
| Justin Wieman
| TKO (cut)
| IHC 5: Tribulation
| 
| align=center| 1
| align=center| 2:20
| Hammond, Indiana, United States
| 
|-
| Win
| align=center| 3–0
| Derrick Noble
| Submission (guillotine choke)
| IHC 4: Armageddon
| 
| align=center| 3
| align=center| 2:25
| Hammond, Indiana, United States
| 
|-
| Win
| align=center| 2–0
| Moto Asai
| Submission (ankle lock)
| FCC 6: Freestyle Combat Challenge 6
| 
| align=center| 2
| align=center| 2:18
| Racine, Wisconsin, United States
| 
|-
| Win
| align=center| 1–0
| Eddie Harps
| Submission (guillotine choke)
| TCC: Total Combat Challenge
| 
| align=center| 1
| align=center| 1:30
| Chicago, Illinois, United States
|

References

External links
 
 
 Gideon Ray IFL Page
 International Fight League
 Hackney's Combat Academy in Roselle, IL

Living people
1973 births
American male mixed martial artists
Welterweight mixed martial artists
African-American mixed martial artists
Mixed martial artists utilizing judo
Mixed martial artists utilizing taekwondo
Mixed martial artists utilizing Brazilian jiu-jitsu
American male taekwondo practitioners
American male judoka
American practitioners of Brazilian jiu-jitsu
People awarded a black belt in Brazilian jiu-jitsu
People from Roselle, Illinois
Ultimate Fighting Championship male fighters
21st-century African-American sportspeople
20th-century African-American sportspeople